CIX (originally Compulink Information eXchange) is an online based conferencing discussion system and was one of the earliest British Internet service providers. Founded in 1983 by Frank and Sylvia Thornley, it began as a FidoNet bulletin board system, but in 1987 was relaunched commercially as CIX. At the core of the service were many thousands of "conferences" - groups established by users to discuss particular topics, conceptually not unlike newsgroups but limited to CIX subscribers (who sometimes describe themselves as 'Cixen'). These conferences still exist today although the CIX service has since expanded to include many other features. The service is funded by a monthly subscription charge rather than by advertising.

In 1988 it provided the first commercial Internet email and Usenet access in the UK.  CIX then grew rapidly, reaching a peak of more than 16,000 users in 1994, before starting to lose customers to the newly formed Internet service providers that offered free access to the mass market using 0845 dial-up, such as Demon (which was started by Cixen Cliff Stanford, whose CIX nickname was 'Demon'), Pipex, AOL and Freeserve. In 2011, it still had almost 9,000 users.

In its heyday, CIX was one of the UK's premier online locations for both technical and social interaction. It hosted several official online support areas for companies such as Borland and Novell and counted among its subscribers many of the UK's technology journalists (some of them wooed with free accounts), which ensured regular mention in the computing press.

The Liberal Democrats have used CIX as a conferencing system and a branded version of the off-line reader Ameol (A Most Excellent Offline-reader) is provided for their use.

Later company history
In 1996 the Thornleys decided to expand CIX's services to include full 0845 dialup Internet access known as CIX Internet. However, take up was limited (possibly due to an above-average cost) even though technically it was rated for many years as one of the best internet providers in the UK.

In March 1998 a management buy-in backed by Legal & General Ventures was successful. The buy-in team, none of whom were previously employed at CIX, comprised Doug Birtley, Managing Director; Niels Gotfredsen, Finance Director; Graham Davies, Sales and Marketing Director and Lisa Pennington. Frank and Sylvia Thornley contracted to remain with the company for a minimum of three years.

In 2000 CIX was sold to Telenor, a Norwegian telecommunications company. CIX was re-branded and merged with XTML of Manchester and Norsk Data of Newbury to form the UK arm of Nextra, the UK Internet subsidiary of Telenor.

In June 2002 the CIX service was outsourced by Telenor to Parkglobe, a company specially set up for the purpose by several long-term CIX staffers and directors, Graham Davies, Charlie Brook and Mat Sims.

In July 2002 Telenor sold the business to GX Networks aka PIPEX.

In February 2001 CIX WCS (Web Conferencing System) was released as beta to a select group then made public beta in May 2001.

In 2004 CIX Conferencing was made accessible via a new service CIX Online by CIX Online Ltd, giving a Web interface as an alternative to the text interface. Customer acceptance of the web interface was limited compared to the OLRs (Off Line Readers - this allowed the upload and download of new messages with messages editing performed off-line) that most Cixen use.

In April 2007 the first prototype of the CIX Forums website was launched by CIX Online Ltd. This new online way to access the content is designed to attract more users.

In September 2008 Graham Davies of CIX Online Ltd. announced that the API behind CIX Forums would be available in October 2008 allowing interested parties to create additional user add-ons.

On 25 May 2011, CIX Online Ltd. was purchased by ICUK, an ISP, hosting and telecoms provider formed in November 2001 by an ex-employee of Compulink Information eXchange Ltd. ICUK in its press release has said it intends to grow and expand CIX Conferencing for new and existing users of both companies.

In April 2012, version 2 of CIX Forums was released. Version 2 contained numerous bug fixes, enhancements, speed optimisations and an improved user interface.

July 2012 brought version 3 of CIX Forums, featuring further design improvements and a new notification system, allowing users to receive instant replies to messages posted.

Technical information
CIX Conferencing is based on the CoSy Conferencing System, though it has been heavily modified by generations of staff to add new features. The CoSy conferencing system used by CIX was initially run on a UNIX server.  (This was initially the same CoSy code-base on which BIX, the US-centric Byte Information eXchange, was based.)

At first, users read the text-based (ISO 8859-1) CIX messages online, but the UK's practice of charging per minute for telephone calls led to the development of off-line readers (OLRs). The first CIX OLR was TelePathy (DOS-based), which developed into the first Windows OLR - WigWam (now an open-source project, under the name Virtual Access). The first official Windows OLR for CIX was called Ameol, from A Most Excellent Off-Line Reader. This handled email, CIX conferencing and Usenet, and is still freely available. It was written independently by Steve Palmer in 1994. The official desktop client is now CIXReader and runs on Windows XP or later and is freely available to all subscribers. Many other OLRs, written by CIX users, are also available for other operating systems, such as Nicola on the Amiga, and Polar for Psion PDAs. Augur is an Open Source OLR designed for CIX.

In 1996, it was decided to port the system to Sun hardware, and upgrade the bank of modems. ISDN dial up access, and ability to use the Internet to blink (a term used to collect messages) were also introduced.

Example conferences
Some of the busiest conferences on CIX are enquire_within (general discussion), bikers, windows_xp (support for, and discussion of, Windows XP), windows_vista, digital_tv, philology (words and their derivations), cultmedia, mac (support for, and discussion of, Apple computers and macOS), Amiga (discussion of the 68k/PPC Amiga platforms), carp (the Campaign for Real Pedantry - discussion of any fine points of detail, often concentrating on the use and abuse of the English language), internet, own.business, gussets_live! and gps (Global Positioning System). Another busy conference is sasha_lubetkin, a conference for a much loved member of the system with the same name.

See also
 WELL - Still-active US precursor of CIX
 BIX - the Byte Information eXchange

References

 Disembodied Fellowship & Real-Time Ribs by Davey Winder 
 Bug Hunting in Corel
 Need to Know, Blinking rules
 PC Pro, How to be an internet Guru. Davey Winder

External links
 
 ICUK Website
 CIX Forums
 CIX Office
 CIXReader
 CIX VFR Club

Internet forums
Bulletin board systems
Pre–World Wide Web online services